Aditya Prateek Singh Sisodia, (born 19 November 1985), known by his stage name Badshah, is an Indian rapper, singer, film producer and businessman known for his Hindi, Haryanvi, and Punjabi music. He started his career in 2006 alongside Yo Yo Honey Singh in his Hip Hop group Mafia Mundeer. He split from Honey in 2012 and released his independent Haryanvi song Kar Gayi Chull, which was later adopted into the 2016 Bollywood movie, Kapoor & Sons. His music has been featured in Bollywood soundtracks for films such as 2014 films Humpty Sharma Ki Dulhania and Khoobsurat. He is also considered one of the highest-paid artists and also a controversial rapper of India, for his songs like Genda Phool and Pagal.

His debut single, "DJ Waley Babu" featuring Aastha Gill, was ranked number one on the Indian iTunes charts within 24 hours of the release. The song crossed a million views on YouTube within 30 hours. In 2016, he collaborated with Navv Inder on "Wakhra Swag" which won the 2016 Punjabi Music Awards for best duo/group and most popular song of the year award. He has appeared in Forbes India Celebrity 100 in 2017, 2018 and 2019 as one of the highest-paid celebrities in India and as the only rapper in the list.

Ever since 2016, roughly each of his commercial works have been topping charts including the YouTube Music Video Charts, BBC Asian Network Charts, other several Indian radio and Indian streaming charts as well. As of 2020, four of his songs peaked on World Digital Song Sales chart by Billboard. His work, "Genda Phool" came out to be commercially one of the most successful yet controversial number in the Indian history.

Early life and family
Badshah was born in Delhi, to a father from Haryana and a mother from Punjab. He is married to Jasmine. They have a daughter Jessemy Grace Masih Singh (born January 11, 2017).

He completed his schooling from Bal Bharti Public School, Pitampura, Delhi where he performed with his school choir. Prior to becoming a full-time musician he enrolled as a math student at the prestigious Banaras Hindu University in Varanasi before moving to civil engineer at PEC, Chandigarh, where he was exposed to new Punjabi music which promoted him to take on "rap" writing. He has stated that if he had not become a rapper, he may have become an IAS officer.

Career 
He started his career in the music industry with the name "Cool Equal", but then changed his name to Badshah. He further is known for his catchphrase "it's your boy Badshah", often stylized as "Ish yo boy Baad-uh-sh-aa-ah".

In 2018, Badshah released his first album O.N.E. – Original Never Ends.

On 7 August 2020, the rapper released a classic pop and hip-hop album namely, 'The Power of Dreams of a Kid' which had 8 tracks and includes features from the artists namely Lisa Mishra, Sikander Kahlon, Fotty Seven, Bali and Music Producer Andy Grewal. The entire mastering and mixings of the album was done by Aditya Dev.

His 2019 song "Paagal" reached 74.8 million views on YouTube within 24 hours, setting the record for the most-viewed video in 24 hours on YouTube. BTS fans claimed that the artist had bought the views to cross the global record due to his low number of likes in the first 24 hours, but YouTube did not confirm whether the views are real or fake. The song also did not appear in the 100-position Global Top Music Videos chart for the week. However, Badshah denied it was fake views, but admitted his record label Sony Music India bought paid Google Ads.

An explanation for YouTube not acknowledging the record was that Badshah's record label Sony Music India had purchased advertisements from Google and YouTube that embedded the video or directed fans to it in some way. However, it has emerged that this is a common practice in the global music industry, and that similar practices had previously been used by the record labels of previous record holders such as Ariana Grande and Blackpink. This has cast doubt on some of the 24-hour viewership records on YouTube.

His song "Genda Phool" was released by Sony Music India in 2020. It had mixing with a Bengali folk song "Boro Loker Biti Lo". Ratan Kahar, a Bengali artist, claimed to be the original writer and composer of the folk song. Though Badshah later released a statement saying that it was a traditional Baul folk song which was not copyrighted, since folk music does not fall under copyright protections and is thus in the public domain.

He again collaborated with Jacqueline Fernandez in the song Pani Pani, the song is sung by Aastha Gill along with him. The song was instant hit and has been viewed more than 500 million times on YouTube. He further released the Bhojpuri version of the song by collaborating with Khesari Lal Yadav. He rapped in the song in Bhojpuri language. The Bhojpuri version got more in One million views in less than an hour and became first Bhojpuri song to do so.

Discography

Singles & collaborations

Film music

Film career

As actor 
Badshah said that Karan Johar offered him Vicky Kaushal's role in a Netflix original film "Lust Stories" and Diljit Dosanjh's role in "Good Newwz", but the popstar denied citing busy schedule and "things-didn't-work-out" things, hence below-mentioned Khandaani Shafakhana is hitherto his only film as an actor.

Badshah, in the film, played the role of himself but with a different name, Gabru Ghaatak, wherein he was a patient of the protagonist, Babita Bedi played by Sonakshi Sinha, with sex disorders who shied away to openly succour Ms. Bedi owing to the taboo around sex in Indian society.

As producer

Awards and nominations

Business career 

Badshah on few occasions has talked about his business ventures, he claimed in 2018 in the song "Take Off" that he has business ventures that are worth at least 9-digits, some of his known brands are BADFIT Clothing, Dragonfly Experience, Afterhours Productions.

Controversy
In August 2020, Badshah confessed to buying crores of fake views for ₹72 lakh on his YouTube videos.

References

External links
 
 
 

Indian rappers
Place of birth missing (living people)
Living people
Indian record producers
People from Delhi
Hindi-language singers
Punjabi-language singers
1985 births